A workplace is a location where someone works, for their employer or themselves, a place of employment. Such a place can range from a home office to a large office building or factory. For industrialized societies, the workplace is one of the most important social spaces other than the home, constituting "a central concept for several entities: the worker and [their] family, the employing organization, the customers of the organization, and the society as a whole". The development of new communication technologies has led to the development of the virtual workplace and remote work.

Workplace issues
 Sexual harassment: Unwelcome sexual advances or conduct of a sexual nature which unreasonably interferes with the performance of a person's job or creates an intimidating, hostile, or offensive work environment.
 Kiss up kick down
 Toxic workplace
 Workplace aggression: A specific type of aggression that occurs in the workplace.
 Workplace bullying: The tendency of individuals or groups to use persistent aggressive or unreasonable behavior against a co-worker or subordinate.
 Workplace conflict: A specific type of conflict that occurs in the workplace.
Workplace culture: The social behaviors and norms in the workplace.
 Workplace counterproductive behaviour: Employee behavior that goes against the goals of an organization.
 Workplace cyber-aggression: Workplace e-mail or text messages that threaten or frighten employees.
 Workplace democracy: The application of democracy in all its forms to the workplace.
 Workplace deviance: Deliberate or intentional desire to cause harm to an organization.
 Workplace discrimination: Discrimination in hiring, promotion, job assignment, termination, and compensation.
 Workplace diversity: Theory that in a global marketplace, a company that employs a diverse workforce is better able to understand the demographics of the marketplace it serves.
 Workplace emotions: Emotions in the workplace play a large role in how an entire organization communicates within itself and to the outside world.
 Workplace employee factors leading to job promotion.
 Laziness in the workplace which could lead to Industrial accidents or other things.
 Workplace empowerment: Provides employees with opportunities to make their own decisions with regards to their tasks.
 Workplace evaluation: A tool employers use to review the performance of an employee.
 Feminisation of the workplace: Trend towards greater employment of women, and of men willing and able to operate with these more 'feminine' modes of interaction.
 Workplace relationships: Directly related to several other area of study including cohesion, job satisfaction, organizational commitment and intention to leave.
 Workplace gender inequality: Relates to wage discrimination and career advancement.
 Workplace gossip: Idle talk or rumor, especially about the personal or private affairs of others.
 Workplace harassment: Offensive, belittling or threatening behavior directed at an individual worker or a group of workers.
 Workplace health surveillance: The removal of the causative factors of disease.
 Workplace hazard controls for COVID-19: Measures employed to control the spread of COVID-19
 Workplace humor: Comedy that revolves around the inner workings of various jobs.
 Workplace incivility: Low-intensity deviant workplace behavior such as rudeness, discourtesy and displaying a lack of regard for others.
 Workplace intervention: Scheme to improve both organizational and individual health as well as help workers manage job stress.
 Workplace jargon: Highly specialized terminology or needlessly complicated and obfuscated phrases sometimes used by managers or colleagues.
 Workplace listening: a type of active listening that is generally employed in a professional environment.
 Mobbing: similar concept to workplace bullying.
 Workplace morale: Workplace events play a large part in changing employee morale, such as heavy layoffs, the cancellation of overtime, canceling benefits programs, and the lack of union representation.
 Workplace menopause: The impact menopause symptoms can have on attendance and performance in the workplace.
 Workplace narcissism 
 Workplace phobia: An actual or imagined confrontation with the workplace or certain stimuli at the workplace causes a prominent anxiety reaction in a person.
 Workplace politics: The use of one's individual or assigned power within an employing organization for the purpose of obtaining advantages beyond one's legitimate authority.
 Workplace privacy: Employees typically must relinquish some of their privacy while at the workplace, but how much can be a contentious issue.
 Workplace probation: A status given to new employees of a company or business.
 Workplace psychopathy: Psychopaths can do enormous damage when they are positioned in senior management roles
 Workplace revenge: Refers to the general action of purposeful retaliation within the workplace in an attempt to seek justice.
 Workplace sabotage: When disgruntled workers damage or destroy equipment or interfere with the smooth running of a workplace.
 Workplace safety: Occupational safety and health is a category of management responsibility in places of employment.
 Workplace spirituality: A grassroots movement with individuals seeking to live their faith and/or spiritual values in the workplace.
 Workplace strategy: The dynamic alignment of an organization’s work patterns with the work environment to enable peak performance and reduce costs.
 Workplace stress: The harmful physical and emotional response that occurs when there is a poor match between job demands and the capabilities, resources, or needs of the worker.
 Workplace surveillance: Businesses use workplace surveillance as a way of monitoring the activities of their employees.
 Workplace swearing: In the UK, swearing in the workplace can be an act of gross misconduct under certain circumstances.
 Professional development: Skills and knowledge attained for both personal development and career advancement.
 Workplace violence Violence that originates from employees or employers and threatens employers and/or other employees.
 Workplace wellness: Program offered by some employers to support behavior conducive to the health of employees.

See also 

Corporation
Employment
Factory
Office
Organization
Whistleblower

References

Further reading